Kishoreganj-6 is a constituency represented in the Jatiya Sangsad (National Parliament) of Bangladesh since 2009 by Nazmul Hassan Papon of the Awami League.

Boundaries 
The constituency encompasses Bhairab and Kuliarchar upazilas.

History 
The constituency was created in 1984 from a Mymensingh constituency when the former Mymensingh District was split into four districts: Mymensingh, Sherpur, Netrokona, and Kishoreganj.

Members of Parliament

Elections

Elections in the 2010s 
Nazmul Hassan Papon was re-elected unopposed in the 2014 general election after opposition parties withdrew their candidacies in a boycott of the election.

Elections in the 2000s 
In February 2009, Zillur Rahman became President of Bangladesh, vacating his parliamentary seat. Nazmul Hassan Papon, his son, was elected in the resulting March by-election.

Elections in the 1990s

References

External links
 

Parliamentary constituencies in Bangladesh
Kishoreganj District